Zooma is the 1999 debut solo album by English musician John Paul Jones, best known as the bassist and keyboardist of Led Zeppelin. The album is primarily composed of instrumental rock.

 Track listing 

All tracks written, composed, and arranged by John Paul Jones.

 Critical reception 

The album received positive reviews from Allmusic and Rolling Stone.

 Personnel 

Adapted from the Zooma'' liner notes, the recording personnel was as follows:

 John Paul Jones – 10 string  bass (1, 4, 6, 9); 12 string bass (2, 3); 4 string bass (5, 7, 8); electric mandola (1); Kyma (1, 2, 4, 7, 9); spoken word (2); mandola (3); bass lap steel (3, 4, 7, 8, 9, 10); guitars (6); organ solo (7); string arrangement and conducting (7)
 Pete Thomas – drums (1, 2, 4, 6, 7, 8, 9)
 Paul Leary – guitar solo (1)
 Trey Gunn – touch guitar solo (2, 6)
 Mo Jones – spoken word (2)
 Denny Fongheiser – djembe (3); drums (5)
 London Symphony Orchestra – strings (7)

The technical personnel was as follows:

 Stuart Sullivan – recording engineer
 Richard Evans – recording engineer
 Brian Foraker – recording engineer
 Geoff Foster – recording engineer
 Akio Morishima – design
 Amy & Tanveer – photography

See also 

 John Paul Jones Official Website

References 

John Paul Jones (musician) albums
1999 albums
Instrumental rock albums
Progressive rock albums by British artists
Heavy metal albums by English artists
Discipline Global Mobile albums